Taviloğlu is a Turkish surname. Notable people with the surname include:

 İstemihan Taviloğlu (1945–2006), Turkish composer and music educator
 Korhan Taviloğlu (born 1962), Turkish surgeon

Turkish-language surnames